Leandro Firmino (born June 23, 1978) is a Brazilian actor.  He is best known for his role as Li'l Zé in the Academy Award nominated City of God. He also had a main role in one episode of spin-off series City of Men. He played the role of Thiago in Trash with Wagner Moura and Rooney Mara. Firmino starred as Goitaca Chief in Rodrigo Rodrigues`s Goitaca with Marlon Blue and Lady Francisco. He was cast as Gilmar in Impuros with Rui Ricardo Dias and Cyria Coentro.

Filmography 

 2002 – City of God – "Li'l Zé"
 2002 – Mauzinha
 2003 – O Corneteiro Lopes
 2005 – Cafundó – Cirino
 2006 – Trair e Coçar É só Começar – Mechanic
 2007 – O Homem Que Desafiou o Diabo – Zé Pretinho
 2012 – As Aventuras de Agamenon, o Repórter
 2012 – City of God - 10 Years Later – Himself
 2012 – No Olho da Rua
 2012 – Totalmente Inocentes – Algodão
 2014 – Julio Sumiu
 2014 – Trash
 2021 – Goitaca

Selected television
 2015-2018 – Magnifica 70 
 2018-2020 – Impuros
 2022 - El Presidente: The Corruption Game

Awards and nominations

External links

References 

1978 births
Living people
Brazilian male film actors
Brazilian male telenovela actors
Male actors from Rio de Janeiro (city)